Havemeyer Oil Company was an American oil company based in Yonkers, New York.

History
The company was in operation from 1901 to 1909 and created products such as the famous Havoline motor oil. It was bought by Indian Refining Company. The founder was John F. Havemeyer.

References

Defunct oil companies of the United States
Defunct companies based in New York (state)
History of Yonkers, New York
Companies based in Yonkers, New York
Defunct energy companies of the United States